Annie Lee Wilkerson Cooper (June 2, 1910 – November 24, 2010) was an African-American civil rights activist in the 1965 Selma Voting Rights Movement who is best known for punching Dallas County, Alabama Sheriff Jim Clark.

Life and work
Annie Lee Wilkerson Cooper was born on June 2, 1910, as Annie Lee Wilkerson in Selma, Alabama, one of ten children of Lucy Jones and Charles Wilkerson Sr. When Cooper finished seventh grade, she dropped out of school and moved to Kentucky to live with one of her older sisters.

In 1962, Cooper returned to Selma to care for her elderly mother. Appalled by the fact that although she had been a registered voter in Pennsylvania and Ohio she was unable to register to vote in Alabama, Cooper began to participate in the Civil Rights Movement. Her attempt to register to vote in 1963 resulted in her being fired from her job as a nurse at a rest home. She then worked as a clerk at the Torch Motel.

In January 1965, Cooper stood in line for hours outside the Dallas County Courthouse to register to vote until Sheriff Jim Clark ordered her to vacate the premises. Clark prodded Cooper in the neck with a billy club until Cooper turned around and hit the sheriff in the jaw, knocking him down. Deputies then wrestled Cooper to the ground as Clark continued to beat her repeatedly with his club. Cooper was charged with "criminal provocation" and was escorted to the county jail, where she was held for 11 hours before being allowed to leave. She spent the period of her incarceration singing spirituals. Some in the sheriff's department wanted to charge her with attempted murder. Following this incident, Cooper became a registered voter in her home state.

On June 2, 2010, Annie Lee Cooper became a centenarian. Reflecting on her longevity, she stated, "My mother lived to be 106, so maybe I can live that long, too." She died on November 24, 2010, at the Vaughan Regional Medical Center in Selma, Alabama.

In popular culture
In the 2014 film Selma, Cooper was portrayed by Oprah Winfrey. Winfrey said that she took the role "because of the magnificence of Annie Lee Cooper and what her courage meant to an entire movement."

External links
 SNCC Digital Gateway: Annie Lee Cooper, Documentary website created by the SNCC Legacy Project and Duke University, telling the story of the Student Nonviolent Coordinating Committee & grassroots organizing from the inside-out.

References

1910 births
2010 deaths
Activists for African-American civil rights
Activists from Selma, Alabama
African-American activists
Women civil rights activists
American community activists
American centenarians
Selma to Montgomery marches
African-American centenarians
Women centenarians
21st-century African-American people